Arthur Heygate Mackmurdo (12 December 1851 – 15 March 1942) was a progressive English architect and designer, who influenced the Arts and Crafts Movement, notably through the  Century Guild of Artists, which he set up in partnership with Herbert Horne in 1882. He was the pioneer of the Modern Style (British Art Nouveau style) and in turn global Art Nouveau movement.

Early life
Mackmurdo was the son of a wealthy chemical manufacturer. He was educated at Felsted School, and was first trained under  the architect T. Chatfield Clarke, from whom he claimed to have learnt nothing.  Then, in 1869, he became an assistant to the Gothic Revival architect James Brooks.  In 1873, he visited John Ruskin's School of Drawing, and accompanied Ruskin to Italy in 1874.  He stayed on to study in Florence for a while; despite the influence of Ruskin, the Italian architecture he was  most impressed by was that of the Renaissance.

Career
In 1874 he opened his own architectural practice at 28 Southampton Street, in central London.

In 1882, Mackmurdo founded the Century Guild of Artists with his friend and fellow architect Herbert Percy Horne.  Others associated with the Guild included most prominently Selwyn Image, but also Clement Heaton, William De Morgan, Heywood Sumner, Christopher Whall, Charles Winstanley, William Kellock Brown, George Esling and John Ruskin's protegee, the sculptor Benjamin Creswick. It was one of the more successful craft guilds of its time.  It offered complete furnishing of homes and buildings, and its artists were encouraged to participate in production as well as design; Mackmurdo himself mastered several crafts, including metalworking and cabinet making.

In 1884, the guild showed a display in the form of a music  room at the Health Exhibition in London; the stand was shown, with variations, at subsequent exhibitions in Manchester and Liverpool. It incorporated two of Mackmurdo's favourite motifs. One was foliage twisted into sinuous curves. Nikolaus Pevsner described Mackmurdo's  use of such foliage on the title page of the designer's own Wren's City Churches (1883) as "the first  work of art nouveau which can be traced", identifying its main influences as Rossetti and Burne-Jones, and ultimately, through them, William Blake.

The second motif was the use of thin square columns, topped with flat squares instead of capitals.  These columns influenced the furniture designs of C.F.A. Voysey, and, through him, Charles Rennie Mackintosh.  Mackmurdo used them architecturally on his own house at 8 Private Road, Enfield (1887), and on a house for the artist Mortimer Menpes, at 25 Cadogan Gardens, Chelsea (1893–94), where he incorporated them into a kind of Queen Anne style.

Mackmurdo made a major donation to the William Morris Gallery in Walthamstow, which is an important repository of the work of the Century Guild.

List of buildings
6 (Halcyon) (1874–6, now demolished) and 8 (Brooklyn) (1883) Private Road, Enfield
16 Redington Road, Hampstead (1889)
12 Hans Road, Chelsea (1894)
25 Cadogan Gardens, Chelsea (1893–4)
109–13, Charterhouse Street (1900)
Great Ruffins, Great Totham (1904)
Village Hall, Great Totham (1929-1930)

References

 Victorian Web: A.H. Mackmurdo, an Overview ("Arthur Heygate Mackmurdo" throughout)
 Pamela Todd, The Arts and Crafts Companion: Introduction: Philosophy & Background
 Lambourne, Lionel (1980) Utopian Craftsmen: The Arts and Crafts Movement from the Cotswold to Chicago. London. Astragal Books

External links
 

1851 births
1942 deaths
19th-century English architects
20th-century English architects
English designers
People educated at Felsted School
Art Nouveau designers
Art Nouveau illustrators
English illustrators